The Delhi Cloth Mills Trophy, known simply as D.C.M. Trophy, was an invitational football tournament in India. It was held annually in New Delhi and was organised by the Delhi Cloth Mills tournament committee. It was India's first football tournament to provide the national clubs with international exposure due to participation of international clubs from Asia and Europe.

History
The tournament was established in 1945 by Bharat Ram and Charat Ram of the Delhi Cloth & General Mills textile conglomerate.

Delhi's local teams won the first two editions; since then, clubs from Calcutta have dominated the 1950s and early 1960s, and foreign clubs since the late 1960s. The tournament has not been organised since 1997 due to fixture congestion and various restructuring policies in Indian club football. Mohun Bagan was the last winner of the tournament.

Results

Notes:
1. Bayerischer withdrew from the replay, so April 25 were declared winners
2. East Bengal were declared winners as Dok Ro Gang refused to play extra time
3. Joint winners after replay
4. Joint winners after replay
5. Abandoned in the 83rd minute due to a riot

References

Defunct football competitions in India
1945 establishments in India
Recurring sporting events established in 1945
1997 disestablishments in India
Football in Delhi
Football cup competitions in India